Gen. Charles S. Farnsworth County Park, also known as Farnsworth Park, is a Los Angeles County park and National Register of Historic Places district (site #97000027) in Altadena, California.

The land was purchased by Los Angeles County in 1921 for use as a nursery.  When the County built new nurseries in the 1930s, a movement to turn the land into a county park was spearheaded by General Charles S. Farnsworth and William O. Davies. Farnsworth designed the park and supervised its grading and landscaping. Davies began planning for a community center. Funds for the construction of the community center came from grants from the Public Works Administration. The park was completed in 1934. The park was originally named Altadena Park.

The park project included a two-story arts and crafts American craftsman style building that was later christened the William D. Davies Memorial Building. The park was renamed in honor of Farnsworth in 1939.

It was placed on the Register in 1997 for its significance as a recreation and architecture site.

References

External links

National Register of Historic Places

Altadena, California
Botanical gardens in California
County parks in California
Buildings and structures on the National Register of Historic Places in Los Angeles County, California
Parks in Los Angeles County, California
San Gabriel Valley
Historic districts on the National Register of Historic Places in California
Parks on the National Register of Historic Places in California